Harriet Cleo King is an American actress. She is best known for her roles on television, particularly Mike & Molly (2010–2016).

Early life
King was born in St. Louis, Missouri, and was the youngest of seven children. She graduated from University of Missouri and later moved to New York to pursue an acting career, first appearing in theatre productions.

Career
In the mid-1990s, King moved to Los Angeles, California, and began appearing on television shows such as The Wayans Bros., Living Single, Malcolm & Eddie, Murphy Brown, and Any Day Now. She also appeared on Friends as a nurse.

King has appeared in a number of films, playing small parts, include Magnolia (1999), Dude, Where's My Car? (2000), Bubble Boy (2001), The Life of David Gale (2003), Dreamgirls (2006), Pineapple Express (2008), The Hangover (2009), Valentine's Day (2010), and Transformers: Age of Extinction (2014). She guest-starred on more than 50 shows, including NYPD Blue, Ally McBeal, Six Feet Under, The West Wing, CSI: Crime Scene Investigation, NCIS, and Ugly Betty.

From 2001 to 2002, King had a recurring role as Helene Parks in the Fox drama series Boston Public, created by David E. Kelley. In 2003, she co-starred in the short-lived CBS drama The Brotherhood of Poland, New Hampshire, also created by Kelley. In 2006, she played Aunt Lou in the HBO drama series Deadwood during its third and final season. In 2009, King had the recurring role as Neeta, the nanny of Jax Teller's son in the FX drama series, Sons of Anarchy.

In 2010, King was cast in the series regular role as grandmother Rosetta "Nana" McMillan in the CBS sitcom Mike & Molly, even though she is only seven years older than Reno Wilson (who played her grandson, Carl).

In 2017 she appeared regularly in Netflix's adaptation of A Series of Unfortunate Events, which premiered in 2017. That same year she appeared as Mrs. Watkins in the film The Bye Bye Man.

On February 22, 2021, King made a cameo appearance in season 2, episode 6 of Fox's 9-1-1: Lone Star. She portrayed Paul Strickland's mother, Cynthia Strickland.

Filmography

Film

Television

References

External links

American television actresses
American film actresses
Living people
Actresses from St. Louis
University of Missouri alumni
African-American actresses
20th-century American actresses
21st-century American actresses
20th-century African-American women
20th-century African-American people
21st-century African-American women
21st-century African-American people
Year of birth missing (living people)